John Greaves (1602–1652) was an English mathematician and antiquary.

John Greaves may also refer to:

John Greaves (musician) (born 1950), British bass guitarist and composer
John Edward Greaves (1846-1923), industrialist and British vice-consul at Berdiansk, Russian Empire.
John Ernest Greaves (1847–1945), Welsh slate mine owner and Lord Lieutenant of Caernarvonshire
John Whitehead Greaves (1807–1880), English businessman
Johnny Greaves (boxer) (born 1979), English boxer
Johnny Greaves (rugby league) (born 1943), Australian rugby player
Johnny Greaves (racing driver) (born 1966), American racetrack driver

See also
John Grieve (disambiguation)